Toechon Public Stadium is a multi-purpose stadium in Gwangju, Gyeonggi-do, South Korea.  It is currently used mostly for amateur football matches and other activities.

Other stadia in Gwangju, Gyeonggi-do, South Korea
Gwangju City Public Stadium, Opo Public Stadium and Silchon Public Stadium are also located in Gwangju, Gyeonggi-do, South Korea.

Football venues in South Korea
Multi-purpose stadiums in South Korea
Sports venues in Gyeonggi Province